Terry Pindell (born ) is an American travel writer known primarily for three North American 'rail odysseys', through the US, Canada and Mexico, each of which became the subject of a travel book. He has also written a book on migration within the United States. The Toledo Blade said of his first book, Making Tracks: "Not since John Steinbeck's Travels with Charley has anyone put together a better story about America on the road."

A New Hampshire resident, Pindell is a former English teacher and mayoral candidate in Keene, NH. He is the grandson of a railroad engineer.

Works
 A Good Place to Live: America's Last Migration by Terry Pindell (1997)
 Yesterday's Train: A Rail Odyssey Through Mexican History coauthored with Lourdes Ramirez Mallis (1997)
 Last Train to Toronto: A Canadian Rail Odyssey (1992)
 Making Tracks: An American Rail Odyssey (1990)

References

American travel writers
American male non-fiction writers
Living people
Year of birth missing (living people)